Cookin' Sherry is an album led by saxophonist Willis Jackson featuring which was recorded in 1959 and 1960 and released on the Prestige label.

Track listing
All compositions by Willis Jackson except where noted.
 "Mellow Blues" (Willis Jackson, Bill Jennings, Jack McDuff) – 9:01
 "Sportin'" (Jackson, Jennings) – 4:47
 "When I Fall in Love" (Edward Heyman, Victor Young) – 4:02
 "Cookin' Sherry" – 8:14
 "Where Are You?" (Harold Adamson, Jimmy McHugh) – 5:41
 "Contrasts" (Jimmy Dorsey) – 5:46

Note
Recorded at Van Gelder Studio in Englewood Cliffs, New Jersey on November 9, 1959 (track 3), February 26, 1960 (tracks 2, 5) and August 16, 1960 (tracks 1, 4, 6)

Personnel
Willis Jackson – tenor saxophone
Jack McDuff – organ
Bill Jennings – guitar
Milt Hinton (tracks 2, 5), Wendell Marshall (tracks 1, 3, 4, 6) – bass
Bill Elliot (tracks 1, 4, 6), Alvin Johnson (tracks 2, 3, 5) – drums
Buck Clarke – congas (tracks 2, 5)

Production
Esmond Edwards – supervision
Rudy Van Gelder – recording

References

Willis Jackson (saxophonist) albums
1961 albums
Prestige Records albums
Albums recorded at Van Gelder Studio
Albums produced by Esmond Edwards